Boort is a town in Victoria, Australia, located next to Lake Boort, in the Shire of Loddon. The town is known for its native birdlife. Boort is a local Aboriginal word meaning "Smoke from the hill".

Main sources of employment are retail, olive processing and tourism. Agriculture is a major industry and employer in the Boort region. Produce includes cereal crops, tomatoes, canola, olives, hay and wool.

Population
The most common responses for religion were No Religion 26.9%, Uniting Church 15.0% and Catholic 12.5%.

Sporting activities
Boort is known as The Northern Oasis.  Lake Boort is central to the town and is used for water sports including skiing, sailing, duck hunting, fishing and swimming.

Boort has an Australian rules football team, Boort Football, Hockey, Netball Club competes in the North Central Football League. Notable players from Boort are VFL Brownlow Medallist John Schultz. The team previously recruited ex-AFL player Lance Picioane. The club colours are black and white.

Golfers play at the Boort Golf Club on Charlton Road.

Infrastructure
The Post Office opened on 14 August 1874, and the railway arrived in 1883.

Boort has a hospital, pharmacy, P-12 school, butcher shop, newsagent, hairdresser, supermarket, hardware store, tyre service, mechanic and community centre.

Notable residents
 Prof. Ruth Fincher AM, prominent Australian geographer and university leader, born in Boort 1951.

Metal Sculpture Competition 
Boort was the home of John Piccoli (died 22 April 2021), dubbed "The Spanner Man", a farmer who in his spare time created sculptures entirely from discarded spanners. Inspired by his work, Boort hosts an annual competition for artists in metal sculpture, resulting in a trail of works around Little Lake Boort.

See also
 Boort railway station
 Boort Secondary College
 Richmond L'Ami
 Robinvale railway line

References

External links 

 SMH Travel: Boort

Towns in Victoria (Australia)
Shire of Loddon